Bobby Osborne (born December 7, 1931) is an American bluegrass musician. He is the co-founder (with his brother Sonny Osborne) of the Osborne Brothers and a member of the Grand Ole Opry and the International Bluegrass Music Hall of Fame.  Osborne was a member of the United States Marine Corps who received a Purple Heart for his service and was honorably discharged in 1953.

Osborne is an instructor of bluegrass music at the Kentucky School of Bluegrass and Traditional Music in Hyden, Kentucky, and his primary instrument is the mandolin.

Early life 
Osborne was born in Thousandsticks in Leslie County, Kentucky.  When he was growing up he helped his father and grandfather at the older man's general store. At the same time he was attracted to the music of the Grand Ole Opry and eventually dropped out of high school to form a band with his brother, Sonny. He helped develop the vocal trio concept in bluegrass music by putting the melody in the tenor voice, instead of putting it in one of the lower voice registers.

Bobby Osborne has released many recordings since the 1950s. The Osborne Brothers recordings of "Rocky Top", and "Kentucky" were named official state songs of Tennessee and Kentucky, respectively. Osborne was drafted into the U.S. Marine Corps in 1951 and served in the Korean War. He was wounded in action and received the Purple Heart.

"Bobby knew nothing about bluegrass music. He was listening to the Grand Ole Opry one night on WSM radio. He liked the sound of that banjo, and found out later on it was Earl Scruggs playing a tune called “Cumberland Gap.” From then on he became interested in that type of music. He appeared on many shows with Ernest Tubb, playing guitar and singing. Ernest Tubb suggested that Bobby play the mandolin to complement his high tenor voice. He took the advice and it remained one of his main instruments for the rest of his career.

Osborne's 2017 solo album ORIGINAL was his first album since Bluegrass & Beyond in 2009. The album was the product of Osborne's collaboration with Peter Rowan, which led him to another collaboration with Alison Brown. The album features many bluegrass/Americana musicians and artists including Vince Gill, Sam Bush, Jim Lauderdale, Sierra Hull, Claire Lynch, Del McCoury, Ronnie McCoury, Robbie McCoury, Stuart Duncan and Rob Ickes.

He also wrote the song, "Windy City" in 1972, later recorded by Alison Krauss on her LP "Windy City." Krauss recorded the song with Suzanne and Sidney Cox performed the song on Jimmy Kimmel Live.

As of 2022 Osborne continues to perform with his band, the Rocky Top X-Press.

Honors and awards 
Inducted to Grand Ole Opry (1964, as member of the Osborne Brothers)

Named Vocal Group of the Year by Country Music Association (1971 as member of the Osborne Brothers)

Inducted to International Bluegrass Music Hall of Honor (1994, as member of the Osborne Brothers).

Awarded the Bluegrass Star Award by the Bluegrass Heritage Foundation of Dallas, Texas on October 20, 2018. The award is bestowed upon bluegrass artists who do an exemplary job of advancing traditional bluegrass music while preserving its character and heritage.

Elected to Kentucky Music Hall of Fame (2002, as member of the Osborne Brothers)

Nominated for Best Bluegrass Album at the 60th Annual GRAMMY® Awards (for solo album Original).

International Bluegrass Music Award (IBMA) for Recorded Event of the Year (2017, for "I've Gotta Get a Message to You")

References

External links
Bobby Osborne & the Rocky Top X-Press
OMS Records - Bobby Osborne
 
 

1931 births
Living people
Bluegrass musicians from Kentucky
Singers from Kentucky
People from Leslie County, Kentucky
American bluegrass mandolinists
Songwriters from Kentucky
Country musicians from Kentucky